Pipera Business Tower is a class A office building located in the city of Bucharest, Romania. It stands at a height of 54 meters and has 13 floors, with a total surface of 13,300 m2. The building features a large sky office on its top floor.

References

Skyscraper office buildings in Bucharest
Office buildings completed in 2009